refers to the belief in rocks as Yorishiro containing Kami in ancient Shinto. It also refers to the rock itself, which is the object of worship.

Overview 

Nature worship, also known as spirit worship or animism, is a type of base faith that has been present in Japan since ancient times. This form of worship revolves around the belief in gods and spirits that reside in nature. In Shinto rituals, gods are said to have descended from shintai, a rock, and the yorishiro, called himorogi, was made the center of the ritual, symbolizing the divine power of the gods.

As time passed and temples, where gods were believed to reside, became more permanent, the object of worship shifted from the body of the gods to the shrine itself. Sacred trees and stones, adorned with shimenawa ropes, can still be seen in many temple precincts.

In addition to rocks, there are several other forms of belief in nature in Japan, including Chinju no Mori, the "island" as a forbidden area, the Okinoshima of Munakata Taisha, belief in mountains such as Rokko Himei Shrine and Mount Miwa, belief in fire, waterfalls, and various weather phenomena such as wind, rain, and lightning.

There is also mention of another rock-related object called Iwasaka, which is believed to be a ritual site centered on a rock. However, there is little evidence of its existence compared to Iwaza. The Nihonshoki (Chronicles of Japan) distinguishes Iwasaka from Iwaza, suggesting that it is a distinct object. A banjiki, on the other hand, is similar to a stone circle, an ancient ruin made of stones arranged in a ring, and serves as a boundary that marks the divine realm and preserves the sacredness of the site.

Some of the megaliths along the Kaido have Buddhism carved on them, and some have Legends attached to them, such as the famous samurai who connected Horses. There is a research group (Iwakura Gakkai) that claims that the belief in rock formations and megaliths, including these, can be traced back to the Jōmon period, and that there are also artificially arranged rock formations, and that their arrangement represents certain figures, directions, or the shape of the Constellation. In contrast to this view, the Iwakura Society points out that it was not until the Kofun period that the Iwakura ritual began. In addition, there is criticism of the theory that megaliths are artifacts.

Gallery

See also 

 Shrine
 Shinto shrine
 Kamagoishi
 Himorogi
 Utaki
 Megalith
 Fujizuka
 Okinoshima
 Crystal healing
 Cinnabar

References

External links 
 イワクラ（磐座）学会

Sacred rocks
Animism
Shinto
Shinto religious objects